Al-Faisaly FC is a Saudi Arabian football team playing in the Saudi Professional League, based in Harmah City with a population of around 15,000 people. The club is named after King Faisal (r. 1964–75); he was crown prince at the time of the club's founding.

History 
Al-Faisaly finished as the runner-up in the 2005–06 first division season, thus becoming the first club from the Sudair region to achieve promotion to the top flight but went straight back down after just one season. Al-Faisaly achieved promotion for the second time to the top flight by winning the 2009-10 first division title, and have been competing in the Saudi Professional League until they were relegated in the 2021–22 campaign after twelve consecutive seasons in the top flight. 

During the 2017-18 season Al-Faisaly managed to reach the 2018 king cup final for the first time in their history, but fell short to Al-Ittihad, losing 3-1 in extra time. Al-Faisaly reached their second king cup final in four years, but this time they managed to win 3-2 against Al-Taawon in the 2020–21 edition with Júlio Tavares scoring a hat trick to secure their first ever top flight title, as well as their first AFC Champions League qualification. Al-Faisaly also qualified to the 2021 Saudi Super Cup after winning their first ever King Cup title on 27 May 2021. Al-Faisaly was defeated in the super cup by Al-Hilal (4–3) on penalties after 2–2 draw.

The club's debut campaign in the 2022 AFC Champions League was a massive success against all odds, Al-Faisaly pulled off a surprising upset by winning 2-1 over Qatari giants and two time AFC Champions League winners Al-Sadd. Al-Faisaly managed to top their group (E) with (2W, 3D,1L) and by doing so have advanced to the round of 16 at the first time of asking.

Honours
Saudi First Division (Level 2)
Winners (1): 2009–10
Runners-up (1): 2005–06
Saudi Second Division (Level 3)
Winners (1): 2002–03
Saudi Third Division (Level 4)
Runners-up (1): 2000–01
Prince Faisal bin Fahd Cup for Division 1 and 2 Teams
Winners (1): 2005–06
King Cup
Winners (1): 2020–21
Runners-up (1): 2018
Super Cup
Runners-up (1): 2021

Current squad
As of 1 July 2022:

Out on loan

Club staff

Managers

 Youssef Baati (1989 – 1990)
 Skander Baklouti (1993 – 1996, 6 July 2001 – 1 May 2002)
 Tariq El Mrabet (1998)
 Taher Lamine (1 July 1999 – 6 December 1999)
 Al Nasser Abou Zaid (6 December 1999 – 1 May 2000)
 Mohammed Khalil (1 August 2000 – 1 May 2001)
 Zouhair Louati (1 August 2002 – 1 May 2003)
 Hassine Menestiri (25 July 2003 – 15 April 2004)
 Bolbol Bayoumy (caretaker) (15 April 2004 – 30 May 2004)
 Mohammed El Sayed (8 July 2004 – 30 March 2005, 29 March 2008 – 19 April 2008)
 Mondher Ladhari (30 March 2005 – 31 May 2005)
 Lotfi El Hashmi (25 June 2005 – 28 November 2005)
 Adlène bin Abderrahmane (28 November 2005 – 2 March 2006)
 Nasser Nefzi (2 March 2006 – 1 May 2006)
 José Morais (17 July 2006 – 16 December 2006)
 Mamdouh Ouka (caretaker) (16 December 2006 – 6 January 2007)
 Bernard Simondi (6 January 2007 – 30 May 2007)
 Carlos Dante (30 June 2007 – 10 November 2007)
 Abderrazek Chebbi (10 November 2007 – 16 February 2008)
 Mourad Ajmi (16 February 2008 – 29 March 2008)
 Nouri Rouatbi (19 April 2008 – 1 June 2008)
 Hadi Ben Mokhtar (23 July 2008 – 9 May 2010)
 Zlatko Dalić (19 May 2010 – 30 April 2012)
 Marc Brys (2 June 2012 – 7 December 2013)
 Issame Charaï (caretaker) (7 December 2013 – 15 December 2013)
 Mohammed El Sayed (caretaker) (15 December 2013 – 27 December 2013)
 Giovanni Solinas (27 December 2013 – 1 May 2014)
 Stéphane Demol (21 May 2014 – 14 March 2015)
 Toni Conceição (14 March 2015 – 22 May 2015)
 Liviu Ciobotariu (6 June 2015 – 17 May 2016)
 Hélio dos Anjos (23 May 2016 – 9 November 2016)
 Fahd Elouarga (caretaker) (9 November 2016 – 19 November 2016)
 Tomislav Ivković (19 November 2016 – 19 February 2017)
 Giovanni Solinas (20 February 2017 – 5 May 2017)
 Vuk Rašović (29 May 2017 – 3 May 2018)
 Mircea Rednic (2 July 2018 – 8 October 2018)
 Péricles Chamusca (14 October 2018 – 1 June 2021)
 Paolo Tramezzani (18 June 2021 – 7 October 2021)
 Daniel Ramos (7 October 2021 – 24 February 2022)
 Fahd Elouarga (caretaker) (24 February 2022 – 27 February 2022)
 Marinos Ouzounidis (27 February 2022 – 30 June 2022)
 Ante Miše (12 July 2022 – 19 January 2023)
 Marinos Ouzounidis (21 January 2023 – 16 March 2023)
 Giovanni Solinas (16 March 2023 – )

International competitions

Overview

Record by country

International record

Matches

References

External links
 Official site
 Official site for Harmah City

 
Faisaly
Faisaly
Faisaly
Faisaly